The women's 200 metre breaststroke event at the 2002 Commonwealth Games as part of the swimming programme took place on 4 August at the Manchester Aquatics Centre in Manchester, England.

Records
Prior to this competition, the existing world record was as follows.

Results

Heats
Both heats were held on 4 August.

Final
The final was held on 4 August.

References

Women's 200 metre butterfly
Commonwealth Games
2002 in women's swimming